Nischalananda Saraswati is the current 145th Jagadguru Shankaracharya of the Purvamnaya Sri Govardhana Peetham of Puri, Odisha, India.

Life

Shri Niscalananda Saraswati was born in Madhubani in 1943, the son of the raj-Pandita of Maharaja of Darabhanga.

See also
Advaita Vedanta
Adi Shankara
Smartism

References

External links
Purvamnaya Sri Govardhana Peetham
About Shri Adi Sankarcharya and His Parampara

Advaita Vedanta
1943 births
Living people
Indian Hindu monks
Shankaracharyas
People from Bihar